Kenneth Boyes (4 February 1935 – 8 August 2010) was an English professional footballer who played as a defender in the Football League for York City and in non-League football for Scarborough. After retiring he worked as a coach, a scout and caretaker manager for Scarborough before scouting for West Bromwich Albion and Manchester United.

References

1935 births
Sportspeople from Scarborough, North Yorkshire
2010 deaths
English footballers
Association football defenders
Scarborough F.C. players
York City F.C. players
English Football League players
English football managers
Scarborough F.C. managers
Scarborough F.C. non-playing staff
West Bromwich Albion F.C. non-playing staff
Manchester United F.C. non-playing staff